The eastern part of the current territory of the Republic of Turkey is part of the ancestral homeland of the Armenians. Along with the Armenian population, during and after the Armenian genocide the Armenian cultural heritage was targeted for destruction by the Turkish government. Of the several thousand churches and monasteries (usually estimated from two to three thousand) in the Ottoman Empire in 1914, today only a few hundred are still standing in some form; most of these are in danger of collapse. Those that continue to function are mainly in Istanbul.

Most of the properties formerly belonging to Armenians were confiscated by the Turkish government and turned into military posts, hospitals, schools and prisons. Many of these were also given to Muslim migrants or refugees who had fled from their homelands during the Balkan Wars. The legal justification for the seizures was the law of Emval-i Metruke (Law of Abandoned Properties), which legalized the confiscation of Armenian property if the owner did not return.

Language, literature, education

Schools

Armenian schools were not allowed in Ottoman Empire until the late 18th century. Unofficially, a number of schools existed in the Bitlis region, but the first school "in real terms" was opened in 1790 by Shnork Migirdic and Amira Miricanyan. During Patriarch Garabet's reign from 1823 to 1831, Armenian schools were established at unprecedented levels. The first higher education institution was opened in 1838 in Uskudar and was named Cemeran School. By 1838, according to the Patriarchate of Constantinople, 439 Armenian schools operated in Anatolia. By the time of the proclamation of the Tanzimat era by Sultan Abdülmecid I in 1839, the Armenians had some thirty-seven schools, including two colleges, with 4,620 students; several museums, printing presses, hospitals, public libraries and eight different published journals in Constantinople alone. According to the Armenian Patriarchate of Constantinople there were 803 Armenian schools in the Ottoman Empire with 81,226 students and 2,088 teachers in 1901–1902. Of these 438 schools were in the Six vilayets with 36,839 students and 897 teachers. During the Armenian genocide, the Armenian population of the empire was targeted a mass extermination. Most schools in Anatolia were destroyed or were set to be used for other purposes. As of 2005, 18 Armenian schools were functioning in Istanbul.

Literature

Notable writers from this period include Siamanto, Hagop Baronian, Vahan Tekeyan, Levon Shant, Krikor Zohrab, Rupen Zartarian, Avetis Aharonyan, Atrpet, and Gostan Zarian.

The 19th century beheld a great literary movement that was to give rise to modern Armenian literature. This period of time during which Armenian culture flourished is known as the Revival period (Zartonk). The Revivalist authors of Constantinople and Tiflis, almost identical to the Romanticists of Europe, were interested in encouraging Armenian nationalism. Most of them adopted the newly created Eastern or Western variants of the Armenian language depending on the targeted audience, and preferred them over classical Armenian (grabar).

The Revivalist period ended in 1885–1890, when the Armenian people was passing tumultuous times. Notable events were the Berlin Treaty of 1878, the independence of Balkan nations such as Bulgaria, and of course, the Hamidian massacres of 1895–1896.

Dialects

Press

Some specialists claim that the Armenian Realist authors appeared when the Arevelk (Orient) newspaper was founded (1884). Writers such as Arpiar Arpiarian, Levon Pashalian, Krikor Zohrab, Melkon Gurjian, Dikran Gamsarian, and others revolved around the said newspaper. The other important newspaper at that time was the Hayrenik (Fatherland) newspaper, which became very populist, encouraged criticism, etc.

Today, three dailies (Agos, Jamanak and Marmara) are published in Istanbul.

Alphabet
As Bedross Der Matossian from Columbia University describes, for about 250 years, from the early 18th century until around 1950, more than 2000 books in the Turkish language were printed using the Armenian script. Not only did Armenians read Armeno-Turkish, but so did the non-Armenian (including the Ottoman Turkish) elite. The Armenian script was also used alongside the Arabic script on official documents of the Ottoman Empire written in Ottoman Turkish. For instance, the first novel to be written in the Ottoman Empire was Vartan Pasha's 1851 Akabi Hikayesi, written in the Armenian script. Also, when the Armenian Duzian family managed the Ottoman mint during the reign of Abdülmecid I, they kept records in Armenian script, but in the Turkish language. From the end of the 19th-century, the Armenian alphabet was also used for books written in the Kurdish language in the Ottoman Empire.

Armenian place names

Initial renaming of Armenian place names were formally introduced under the reign of Sultan Abdulhamit II. In 1880, the word Armenia was banned from use in the press, schoolbooks, and governmental establishments, and was subsequently replaced with words like Anatolia or Kurdistan. Armenian name changing continued under the early Republican era up until the 21st century. It included the Turkification of last names, change of animal names, change of the names of Armenian historical figures (i.e. the name of the prominent Balyan family was concealed under the identity of a superficial Italian family called Baliani), and the change and distortion of Armenian historical events.

Most Armenian geographical names were in the eastern provinces of the Ottoman Empire. Villages, settlements, or towns that contain the suffix -kert, meaning built or built by (i.e. Manavazkert (today Malazgirt), Norakert, Dikranagert, Noyakert), -shen, meaning village (i.e. Aratashen, Pemzashen, Norashen), and -van, meaning town (i.e. Charentsavan, Nakhichevan, Tatvan), indicate an Armenian name. Throughout Ottoman history, Turkish and Kurdish tribesmen have settled into Armenian villages and changed the native Armenian names (i.e. the Armenian Norashen was changed to Norşin). This was especially true after the Armenian genocide, when much of eastern Turkey was depopulated of its Armenian population.

It is estimated by etymologist and author Sevan Nişanyan that 3600 Armenian geographical location names have been changed.

Religious buildings

Overview
In 1914, the Armenian Patriarchate of Constantinople compiled a list of monasteries, churches and other religious institutions throughout the Ottoman Empire. The Patriarchate revealed that 2,549 religious sites under the control of the Patriarch which included more than 200 monasteries and 1,600 churches.

In 2011, there were 34 Armenian churches functioning in Turkey, mostly in Istanbul.

List of notable churches, monasteries

See also
Armenians in Turkey
Armenian genocide
Armenian culture
Confiscated Armenian properties in Turkey
Anti-Armenian sentiment in Turkey
Khachkars of the Armenian cemetery in Julfa

References

External links
Multi-Cultural Heritage of Anatolia Project Interactive Map
 - Article 6

Armenian culture
Turkish people of Armenian descent
Armenian genocide